Bucșă (older font Bucşă), pronounced with a short final ă [ə], also frequently spelled as Bucșa and pronounced with a long final -a [a], is a Romanian family name. The name comes from the iron bolt on a cartwheel.

Those with the name:
Dan Bucșă usually spelled Dan Bucșa (1988) Romanian football (soccer) midfielder
Cristina Bucșa Moldovan-born Spanish tennis player

See also
 Bucşa (disambiguation)

References

Romanian-language surnames